Merle Leland Youngs (December 2, 1886 – October 8, 1958) was the manufacturer of Trojan condoms in Trenton, New Jersey at Youngs Rubber. He was chairman of the board, treasurer and director. He was one of the first to advertise condoms to pharmacists and doctors. The brands were sold to Charlie Chrisman and in 2001 to Church and Dwight.

Biography
He was born on December 2, 1886 in New York.
He died on October 8, 1958.

References

1886 births
1958 deaths
Businesspeople from Trenton, New Jersey
Condoms
20th-century American businesspeople